NAC1 may refer to:

NAC1 (gene)
NAC-1 or NAC Freelance, an aircraft

See also 
Sodium chloride (chemical formula NaCl)
Naci (disambiguation)
NaCl (disambiguation)